is a pink film actress and an early Japanese AV idol of the 1980s.

Life and career
Kikuchi was born in Nagoya, Aichi Prefecture, Japan on April 5, 1965. She started as a fuzoku (sex industry) girl in hotels and soaplands and also made appearances in several underground pornographic films. Her official AV debut was at age twenty in the video Beautiful D-Cup Girl, Sister L, released in September 1985 by CineMagic. Kikuchi has been called the first adult video performer whose career was built around her exceptionally large breasts for that time in Japan.

Kikuchi's pink film debut was with Million Film in their  in 1986. In August of the same year, she starred in a pink film for Shintoho Eiga, . This film has Kikuchi playing "Eri", a nude model and AV actress who becomes romantically involved with her manager. 
In 1988 she starred in one of Nikkatsu's last Roman Porno films, and in 1993 she would star in another theatrical Big-Bust title, for Excess Films, Nikkatsu's post-Roman Porno line of theatrical softcore pornography. During the late 1980s and early 1990s, Kikuchi also appeared in a number of photobooks, mostly with the BDSM theme of rope bondage.

In 2003, she was working as a lecturer/demonstrator at the AV Cultures School, a school started by male AV actor, Shinji Kubo, to train future AV directors.

By December 2004 Kikuchi, aged 39, had returned to AV with a series of videos for Madonna, a studio specializing in "mature" actresses. She also performed in Mourning Dress Slave / Eri Kikuchi in July 2005 for CineMagic, the AV company she had made her début with 20 years previously.

As of 2013, Eri Kikuchi was billed at the Nagoya fashion health Nishiki VIP Toshima.

Partial videography

Notes

Sources

External links
 
 

1965 births
Bondage models
Japanese pornographic film actresses
Pink film actors
Japanese female adult models
Living people
People from Nagoya